Always Like New is the fourth solo studio album by American singer Jennifer Nettles. It was released on June 25, 2021, and is her first release under Concord Records. Taking inspiration from Broadway, the album consists of cover songs from Broadway plays and features arrangements by Alex Lacamoire.

Three singles were released from Always Like New, "Sit Down, You're Rockin' the Boat", "Wait for It", and "Oh, What a Beautiful Mornin'".

Background

Track listing 
All tracks are produced by Alex Lacamoire, Adam Zotovich, Scott Patton and Jennifer Nettles.

Personnel

Musicians 

 Jennifer Nettles – vocals
 Alex Lacamoire – acoustic piano (1, 2, 4, 5, 9, 10), Fender Rhodes (4), celesta (4), Wurlitzer electric piano (8), organ (9)
 Joseph Joubert – acoustic piano (7), organ (7)
 Dillion Kondor – acoustic guitar (1, 4, 8)
 Scott Patton – acoustic guitar (1, 3-6, 8), electric guitar (2, 3, 7, 9) 
 Clay Sears – acoustic guitar (3, 9), electric guitar (3, 9)
 Andrew Keenan – dobro (3), acoustic guitar (5, 6), banjo (6), pedal steel guitar (6)
 Jeffrey Carney – upright bass (1)
 Paul Bushnell – bass guitar (2, 3, 9), electric bass (7)
 John Patitucci – upright bass (4)
 Zev Kats – upright bass (5, 6)
 Joshua Day – drums (2, 5-7)
 Victor Indrizzo – drums (3, 9)
 Aaron Heick – saxophones (2, 7)
 Tom Timko – saxophones (2)
 Randy Andos – bass trombone (2)
 Michael Davis – trombone (2, 7)
 Nick Marchoine – trumpet (2, 7)
 Andrew Janss – cello (1, 5)
 Rebecca Young – viola (1, 5)
 Shmuel Katz – viola (5)
 Lisa Kim – violin (1, 5)
 Suzanne Ornstein – violin (1, 5)
 Antoine Silverman – violin (6)
 Casey Erin Clark – backing vocals (2, 7)
 Allyson Kaye Daniel – backing vocals (2, 7)
 Allen René Louis – backing vocals (2, 7)
 Angela Grovey – backing vocals (2, 7)
 Zonya Johnson – backing vocals (2, 7)
 Jason McCollum – backing vocals (2, 7)
 Michael McElroy – backing vocals (2, 7), vocal arrangements (2, 7)
 Anastasia Talley – backing vocals (2, 7)
 Virginia Woodruff – backing vocals (2, 7)
 Brandi Carlile – vocals (5)

Production and technical 

 Adam Zotovich – executive producer 
 Alex Lacamoire – producer, arrangements, orchestrations 
 Jennifer Nettles – producer, arrangements 
 Scott Patton – co-producer
 Joseph Joubert – arrangements (7)
 Ian Kagey – engineer
 Derik Lee – engineer 
 Neal Avron – mixing 
 Scott Skrzynski – mix assistant 
 Bri Holland – editing 
 Chris Gehringer – mastering at Sterling Sound (New York City, New York)
 Misa Iwama – music librarian 
 Emily Grishman – music copyist 
 Aiden Terry – music copyist 
 Stephanie Leah Evans – music assistant 
 Jacqueline Godfrey – music assistant 
 Isaac Hayward – music assistant 
 Scott Wasserman – music assistant 
 Carrie Smith – art direction 
 Sage Lamonica – package design 
 Shervin Lainez – photography

Charts

Release history

References 

2021 albums
Jennifer Nettles albums
Concord Records albums